In chemistry, vinylene (also  or 1,2-ethenediyl) is a divalent functional group (a part of a molecule) with formula −CH=CH−; namely, two carbons, each connected to the other by a double bond, to an hydrogen atom by a single bond, and to the rest of the molecule by another single bond.

This group can be viewed as a molecule of ethene (ethylene, H2C=CH2) with an hydrogen removed from each carbon; or a vinyl group −CH=CH2 with one hydrogen removed from the terminal carbon.  It should not be confused with the vinylidene group =C=CH2 or >C=CH2.

A vinylene unit attached to two distinct atoms other than hydrogen (namely R−CH=CH−R') is a source of cis-trans isomerism.

The vinylene group is the repeating unit in polyacetylene and in polyenes.

See also 
 Vinyl group, the monovalent group −CH=CH2

References

Alkenes
Functional groups